Celestial eye goldfish or Choutengan is a double-tailed breed of fancy goldfish that has a breed-defining pair of telescope eyes which are turned upwards, pupils gazing skyward. When the fry hatch, the eyes of young Celestials are normal but gradually protrude sideways, as in the Telescope eye goldfish, but unlike the telescope, which has eyes facing outwards on each side, the eyes of the celestial eye turns strictly upwards within a period of six months of development. This process is entirely governed by genetics, though early sources perpetuated the myth that the fish were bred and kept in narrow-necked clay jars and the eyes turned upwards seeking the limited source of light.

Origins
Celestials first appeared as a direct mutation of the Telescope goldfish in the 18th century. Competing traditions lay claim as to exactly where this happened first, Korea or China. The first documentation that Celestials existed appears on a Chinese scroll of 1772, where a goldfish lacking a dorsal fin and possessing protuberant upturned eyes is depicted.  Celestials did not arrive in Japan until 1903 when thirty specimens arrived from China and became the foundation stock for Japanese breeders. Japan quickly became the leading producer of Celestials for export. This remained so until the outbreak of World War II.  Celestials arrived in the United States from Japan in the first decade of the twentieth century and were included in the first edition of William T. Innes's Goldfish Varieties and Tropical Aquarium Fishes in 1917. American fanciers successfully bred the fish and, in turn, exported foundation stock to Great Britain. After World War II, and ever since, the majority of Celestials exported from Asia are of Chinese origin. A Celestial goldfish is depicted on a postage stamp issued in 1960 by the People's Republic of China.

Description
The Celestial is a goldfish that has an elongated egg-shaped body similar to the Bubble Eye. Like the Bubble Eye, the Celestial does not have a dorsal fin. Their paired fins are of the Fantail or Ryukin type. The caudal may be half as long, to as long as, the body. They are most commonly seen with  metallic scales colored shades of orange (called 'red' by fanciers), white, or red and white. Celestials with nacreous scales are known but rarely seen.

Despite their limited vision and their lack of a dorsal fin, they are active and agile swimmers. They do require some special attention since, in addition to having easily damaged upward-oriented eyes (and, as a result, having limited vision), they are sensitive to cold water temperatures. They are unable to compete with more vigorous goldfish for food.  Sharp ornaments and objects in the aquarium are inadvisable. They are best kept with other limited-vision breeds (e.g. the Bubble Eye) or in a tank of their own.

Variants
The original Celestial breed, described above, is still bred and exported by Chinese and Japanese breeders and is commercially available to fanciers, though they are not as commonly stocked by aquarium shops and dealers as some other goldfish varieties.  It is this 240+ year old form that is described in the American standard adopted by the American Goldfish Association and the Goldfish Society of America. British fanciers prefer their Celestials to have deeper bodies and shorter fins, and have selectively bred for these features as required by the British standard. In recent decades, the Chinese have crossed Celestials with several other breeds, most commonly Lionheads, Ranchus and Pompoms, producing much larger fish with short ranchu-like fins and very deep, blocky bodies, often with nasal 'bouquets' (pompoms) and rudimentary headgrowths.

Some of these crosses tend to be less animated swimmers, especially those that possess a short, sharply downturned, ranchu-like caudal peduncle with flared and short caudal fins, traits which are otherwise uncharacteristic for the breed. Such fish can be quite sedentary,  spending most of their time at or near the bottom of the aquarium; however, a more expansive color range can be found among these hybrids, with metallic specimens  appearing in chocolate, black and various bi-colors in addition to the standard metallic colors,  and nacreous fish seen in bi-color, tri-color and calico. These hybrids are not generally available commercially outside Asia but can be acquired through specialist dealers and importers. The Deme-ranchu is identical to the Celestial in conformation save for its telescopic eyes which do not turn upward. In any spawning of Celestials, many fry will be found to mature with telescopic eyes that never turn upwards. These fish are identical to deme-ranchu. The Toadhead or Hama-tou in Japanese, is similar to the Celestial in having upward-turned eyes, though they are not protuberant, each supporting a small bubble-like growth sacs beneath it. It is believed to be the ancestor to both the celestial eye and bubble eye goldfish.

See also

Bubble Eye
Telescope (goldfish)

References

Innes, Dr William T. "The Sacred Fish of Korea," Aquarium Highlights, Innes Publishing Co. Philadelphia, 1951.
Innes, Dr. William T. Goldfish Varieties and Tropical Aquarium Fishes, 9th Edition, Innes Publishing Co, Philadelphia, 1926.
Matsui, Dr. Yoshiichi, Goldfish Guide, 2nd Edition, TFH Publications, Inc, Neptune, N.J. 1981
Hervey, G.F. & Hems, J. The Goldfish, 1st Edition, Batchworth Press, London, 1948.

External links
 Varieties of Goldfish -About Celestial Eye